The BMW Ladies Classic was a women's professional golf tournament on the Ladies European Tour that took place near Düsseldorf, Germany.

The 1989 tournament held June 8–11 is notable as it marked Marie-Laure de Lorenzi's third consecutive back-to-back win, a Ladies European Tour record.

Winners

Source:

References

External links
Ladies European Tour

Former Ladies European Tour events
Golf tournaments in Germany
Recurring sporting events established in 1989
Recurring sporting events disestablished in 1990
Defunct sports competitions in Germany